"All on Black" is a song by the Chicago-based punk rock band Alkaline Trio, released as the second single from their 2003 album Good Mourning. The single was released only in the United Kingdom, with acoustic versions of "All on Black" and "We've Had Enough" recorded live for the Student Broadcast Network as B-sides, and reached #60 on the UK Singles Chart.

A music video for the song was planned, which was to feature Marilyn Manson as the devil in a purgatory-themed casino gambling against singer/guitarist Matt Skiba. However, the video was never filmed as Manson pulled out of the project. Commenting on the concept, Skiba remarked:

It sounds a bit cheesy, but the script was great and the set was going to be awesome, totally like Dario Argento-esque, just really creepy. We were going to have angels and all kinds of weird shit, really carnival like and trippy [...] we had the place rented and everything and just needed Manson, but he bailed and we kind of asked ourselves whom else could we get for the role and we kind of decided who could replace Manson. We were just so disappointed we were just like fuck it.

Track listing

 The data portion of the enhanced CD consists of the music video for "We've Had Enough".

Personnel

Band
 Matt Skiba – guitar, lead vocals
 Dan Andriano – bass, backing vocals
 Derek Grant – drums

Additional musicians
 Jerry Finn – backing vocals on "All on Black"

Production
 Joe McGrath – engineer, producer
 Jerry Finn – co-producer, mix engineer
 Christopher Holmes, Jason Gossman, and Robert Reed – assistant engineers
 Brian Gardner – mastering

Artwork
 Keath Moon – artwork, layout, and design

References 

Alkaline Trio songs
2003 songs
Songs written by Matt Skiba
Songs written by Dan Andriano
Songs written by Derek Grant (drummer)
Vagrant Records singles
2003 singles